The Tidung, Tidong (Jawi: تيدوڠ) are a native group originating from northeastern part of Borneo and surrounding small islands. They live on both sides of the border of Malaysia and Indonesia.

Tidung speak Tidong language, a North Bornean language. The Tidong are traditionally farmers practising slash-and-burn agriculture. Some are ocean fishermen. They grow sweet potatoes, cassava, lentils, fruits, and vegetables.  Their farming methods are often accused of being the main cause of forest fires in Kalimantan.

The rise of the Muslim Tidung Sultanate molded the ethnogenesis character of the Tidung people. They collectively known as a Malayalised Dayak (Indonesian: Dayak berbudaya Melayu or Dayak-Melayu) people of Kalimantan similar to other native Muslim coastal Borneo groups, such as the Bulungan, Kutainese, Banjarese and Paserese people. Most Tidungese people perceived themselves as Malay due to the stronger self-affiliation with the Malay-Muslim identity.

Etymology
The term tidung in Tarakan language of the Tidung people literally means "hill" or "hill people". As with many other tribes of the Malay Archipelago, the term tidung is a collective term used to describe many closely related indigenous groups. The different groups of Tidung people describe themselves in all cases as Tidung people, however, they are summarized by modern ethnology as a common people group due to similarities in cultural and religious traditions.

Settlement areas
The traditional territories of the Tidung people are at the Sembakung River, North Kalimantan and Sibuku River of their headwaters to the estuary north of Tarakan Island, Indonesia thence along the coast; south to the river-mouth of Bolongan River and northward up to Tawau, Sabah, Malaysia including Cowie Harbour. An enclave of Tidung people located at Labuk River, opposite the city of Klagan.

Demographics
For Malaysia in the state of Sabah, the census of 2010 (Census 2010) indicates a population of 28,515 Tidong. Whereas, Tidung people in other states have no statistical relevance.

For Indonesia, the population of the Tidung people is estimated about 27,000 in the year of 2007.

Language

The Tidung language spoken by the Tidung people is also part of other Murutic language, which in turn belongs to the Western Malayo-Polynesian languages. The Tidung language is spoken in different dialects, namely:-
 Nonukan, Penchangan, Sedalir, Tikal, Tarakan, Sesayap and Sibuku dialect in Indonesia
 Tarakan and Sesayap dialect in Sabah, Malaysia

Writing system
Prior to present-day Roman writing system, the Tidung people used Jawi script in their writings.

Folktales and fables 
Among the Tidung folktale includes:
Asal-usul Orang Tidung Tengara (The origin of Tidung Tenggara people)
Lasedne sinan pagun (The sink of Jelutong village)
Seludon Ibenayuk (The tale of Ibenayuk)
Si Benua dan Si Sumbing (Benua and Sumbing)
Seludon Yaki Yamus (The tale of Four-eyed king)
Seludon Batu Tinagad (The logged stone)
Yaki Balak (The story of Aki Balak)

References

Ethnic groups in Indonesia
Ethnic groups in Sabah
Ethnic groups in Palawan
Muslim communities of Indonesia
Dayak people